Kök-Jar is a village in the southwest of Nookat District, Osh Region, Kyrgyzstan. Its population was 3,573 in 2021. Mitalip Mamytov, who performed the first brain surgery in Kyrgyzstan, was born in Kök-Jar.

References

Populated places in Osh Region